Siavosh may refer to:
 Siavosh, Ardabil
 Siavosh, Lorestan
 Siavosh, Tarighi
 Siyâvash, a character in the Shahnameh epic